Eudokia (Late Greek: Εὐδοκία) was the first empress consort of Byzantine Emperor Justinian II.

Empress
The name and place of burial of Eudokia in the Church of the Holy Apostles was recorded in De Ceremoniis by Constantine VII. However little else is known of her. She is presumed to have been married to Justinian II during his first reign (685–695) and to have either predeceased him or divorced him by the time of his second marriage to Theodora of Khazaria in 703. 

A daughter of Justinian is reported by the chronicle of Theophanes the Confessor and the Chronographikon syntomon of Ecumenical Patriarch Nikephoros I of Constantinople to have been betrothed to Tervel of Bulgaria between 704 and 705. Her name is presumed to have been "Anastasia", after her paternal grandmother, Anastasia. She is the only known child attributed to Eudokia.

Possible descendants
Modern genealogists have theorised Eudokia and Justinian II may have descendants among later Bulgarian and Byzantine royalty and nobility. The theories rely on the successful marriage of her daughter "Anastasia" to Tervel of Bulgaria; however, the Byzantine chroniclers give us only fragmentary knowledge of the Bulgarian royal lineages of her time and no clear description of the relations the Bulgarian monarchs had to each other. Thus there is little evidence to support them beyond the theoretical level.

See also

List of Byzantine emperors
List of Roman and Byzantine Empresses

References

External links

7th-century births
7th-century deaths
Burials at the Church of the Holy Apostles
Heraclian dynasty
7th-century Byzantine empresses